Play in Group F of the 2006 FIFA World Cup began on 12 June and completed on 22 June 2006. Brazil won the group and advanced to the second round, along with runners-up Australia. Croatia and Japan failed to advance. Australia's win against Japan was the first (and so far only) by a team from the Oceania Football Confederation. Australia were representing the Asian Football Confederation in their World Cup victories against Serbia in the 2010 FIFA World Cup, Tunisia and Denmark in the 2022 FIFA World Cup. It is also the only time that a team from the OFC has advanced to the last 16 of the tournament, as in 1974 Australia qualified as one of only 16 teams in the tournament.

Standings

Brazil advanced to play Ghana (runners-up of Group E) in the round of 16.
Australia advanced to play Italy (winner of Group E) in the round of 16.

Matches
All times local (CEST/UTC+2)

Australia vs Japan

Brazil vs Croatia

Japan vs Croatia

Brazil vs Australia

Japan vs Brazil

Croatia vs Australia

Notes

F group
Brazil at the 2006 FIFA World Cup
Australia at the 2006 FIFA World Cup
Japan at the 2006 FIFA World Cup
Croatia at the 2006 FIFA World Cup